The Cambridge Guide to Women's Writing in English is a biographical dictionary of women writers and women's writing in English published by Cambridge University Press in 1999. It was edited by Lorna Sage, with Germaine Greer and Elaine Showalter as advisory editors, and contains more than 2,500 entries written by over 300 contributors.

References

External links 
The Cambridge Guide to Women's Writing in English at Cambridge University Press.

1999 non-fiction books
British biographical dictionaries
Cambridge University Press books
Biographical dictionaries of women
Books about writers
Women writers